Henry Wilson (12 March 1864 – 7 March 1934) was a British architect, jeweller and designer.

Career

He was born at 91 Red Rock Street in West Derby near Liverpool on 12 March 1864. He studied at the Kidderminster School of Art before being articled to the architect Edward James Shrewsbury in Maidenhead. He then worked and was trained in the practices of John Oldrid Scott, John Belcher and J. D. Sedding.

After Sedding's death in 1891 Wilson completed many of Sedding's schemes. He followed Sedding's ideals, but his designs were often more original and grander in scale.

From about 1895 Wilson designed metalwork, church plate and furnishings, jewellery and sculpture, becoming a gifted craftsman in the Arts and Crafts Movement. He was in business at 17 Vicarage Gate, Kensington, London from 1896 to 1899. In 1892 he joined the Art Workers Guild.

From 1896 he taught in London at the Central School of Arts and Crafts, and from 1901 taught metalwork at the Royal College of Art. He was the first editor of the Architectural Review, from 1896 to 1901.

In 1902 he became associated with the circle of William Richard Lethaby in the Liverpool Cathedral Scheme. In 1903 his practical manual, Silverwork and Jewellery, was published. In 1905 he designed the bronze doors for the Cathedral of St. John the Divine in New York.

Wilson selected the British jewellery for the Paris Exhibition of 1914. He served as president of the Arts and Crafts Exhibition Society from 1915 to 1922, organised the major Arts and Crafts Exhibition at the Royal Academy in 1916, and in 1917 became Master of the Art Workers Guild. He was a member of the International Society of Sculptors, Painters and Gravers. After World War I, he again selected British jewellery for the Paris Exhibition of 1925.

Personal life
In 1901 he married Margaret Ellinor Morse, the daughter of Francis Morse, Vicar of St. Mary's Church, Nottingham. They had three daughters, Fiammetta, Pernel (later known as the violinist Orrea Pernell, 1906–1993), and Dione (later known as the television chef Dione Lucas) and one son, Guthlac.

In 1922 he emigrated to Paris with his wife, and after her death 1931 he moved to Menton. Wilson died in Menton on 7 March 1934.

Architectural works
Holy Trinity Sloane Street London, - commissioned to finish the church after Sedding died in 1891
Welbeck Abbey chapel and library 1890 - 1896
Church of Our Most Holy Redeemer, Exmouth Market, Islington, London, 1892 - 1895
Public Library, Ladbroke Grove, London, 1891
St Peter's Church, Ealing, London, 1892
Douglas Castle, Lanarkshire, - Refitting of chapel, 1894
Holy Trinity Church, Ilfracombe, lychgate and vestry, 1894
Church of St Mary the Virgin, Norton Sub Hamdon, Somerset. -Restoration work 1894 and 1904
St. Clement's Church, Boscombe, Hampshire. 1895
St Mark's, Brithdir, near Dolgellau, Gwynedd, 1895 - 1898
St Bartholomew's Church, Brighton, -Baldacchino 1899 - 1900, tabernacle door, communion rails, pavement candlesticks, frieze in choir stalls, pulpit, Lady Altar 1902, Octagonal font 1908, wooden gallery 1906.
All Saints', Kenton, Teignbridge, Devon, -Silver Rood
Gloucester Cathedral -north transept clock case 1903.
St. Mary's Church, Nottingham -Bronze doors in south porch. 1904
Church of St Dyfrig and St Samson, Grangetown, Cardiff, 1904 -reredos
St Bartholomew's Church, Sydenham, London High altar, reredos and communion rails 1904
Elphinstone Tomb, King's College, Aberdeen 1912 - 1926
Ripon Cathedral pulpit 1913
Memorial Cross to Frederick Norman, St. Andrew's Churchyard, Much Hadham, Hertfordshire
Statues of Leofric, Godiva and Justice, Council House, Earls Street Coventry
Tonbridge School Gate of Remembrance 1918
Salada Tea Company, Boston, bronze doors. 1927
Cathedral of St. John the Divine, New York. West end bronze doors. 1927 - 1931
St Augustine of Canterbury Church, Highgate, London N6. Lady Chapel 1930.

Gallery

References

Bibliography
 Manton, Cyndy. Henry Wilson: Practical Idealist, The Lutterworth Press (2009), .
 Thomas, John. "The Elphinstone monument at King's College Aberdeen. Its construction in the sixteenth century and reconstruction (1909-31) by Henry Wilson", Aberdeen University Review, Vol. LIV, 4, No. 188 Autumn 1992, pp. 315–333.
 Thomas, John. "The Spirits about the throne. Henry Wilson's Elphinstone monument, Aberdeen", in Happiness, Truth & Holy Images. Essays of Popular Theology and Religion & Art, Wolverhampton, Twin Books, 2019, pp. 51–56.

External links
http://www.henrywilson.eu 

1864 births
1934 deaths
Arts and Crafts movement artists
Architects from Liverpool
People from West Derby
Masters of the Art Worker's Guild